The acronym CEEC may refer to:
 Committee of European Economic Co-operation, a 1947 European conference on economic co-operation
 China Energy Engineering Corporation, a Chinese state-owned energy conglomerate
 Central and Eastern European Countries, a generic term for a group of European countries, usually meaning former communist states in Europe
 Communion of Evangelical Episcopal Churches, an Anglican Christian communion